Denys Kamerylov (born 24 June 1989) is a Ukrainian sprint canoer. He is a silver medalists of the World Championships and medalist of the European Championships.

References

External links
Ukrainian Canoe Federation

Ukrainian male canoeists
Living people
ICF Canoe Sprint World Championships medalists in Canadian
1989 births
Universiade medalists in canoeing
Universiade gold medalists for Ukraine
Universiade silver medalists for Ukraine
Medalists at the 2013 Summer Universiade
Sportspeople from Poltava
21st-century Ukrainian people